Bruno Rosetti (born 5 January 1988) is an Italian rower. He won the bronze medal in the coxless four at the 2020 Summer Olympics and a silver and a bronze medal at the World Rowing Championships.

Achievements

References

External links
 

1988 births
Living people
Italian male rowers
Olympic rowers of Italy
Rowers at the 2020 Summer Olympics
Sportspeople from Ravenna
Olympic bronze medalists for Italy
Medalists at the 2020 Summer Olympics
Olympic medalists in rowing